Miguel Otero Silva (October 26, 1908 – August 28, 1985), was a Venezuelan writer, journalist, humorist and politician. A figure of great relevance in Venezuelan literature, his literary and journalistic works related strictly to the socio-political history of Venezuela. Throughout his life he was repeatedly forced into exile. Later on, after the establishment of a democratic state in 1958, he was elected to the Venezuelan Senate.

Early career
Born in Barcelona, Anzoátegui, Otero Silva moved to Caracas at very young age to attend high school at the Liceo Caracas. He later studied civil engineering at the Universidad Central de Venezuela. During this time he engaged in early literary activities, writing for magazines and newspapers such as Élite and Fantoches, as well as other university publications. He also started dabbling in journalism.

During the country's Student’s Week in 1928, Otero Silva formed part in a series of protests against the rule of dictator Juan Vicente Gómez (see Generation of 1928 ). He also became involved in a military plot to overthrow the government, which forced him into exile, in Curaçao. There, along with Gustavo Machado, Rafael Urbina López and other Venezuelan expatriates he participated in the taking of Fort Amsterdam in Willemstad on June 29 of the same year, in another attempt to overthrow president Gómez. The plot, supported by 250 men, in addition to notable communists  such as José Tomás Jiménez and Guillermo Prince Lara, involved the kidnapping of governor . The revolutionaries plundered the island's weapons, ammunition and treasury and hauled governor Fruytier back to Venezuela on board the stolen American ship Maracaibo. Although the revolutionaries landed at La Vela de Coro they were defeated by Gómez' forces, and the raid ended in failure. Otero Silva was once more sent into exile, this time in Colombia. He was accompanied by Machado, Urbina, as well as other revolutionaries. During this time, Otero Silva worked on his first novel, Fiebre (Fever), later published in 1939. By 1930 he had become affiliated with the Marxist group, Comintern.

1935–1958
He was able to return to Venezuela following the death of dictator Juan Vicente Gómez in 1935. Taking advantage of the freedom of speech allowed by Gómez's successor, Eleazar López Contreras, Otero Silva published humorous political poetry in newspapers. Eventually tagged as a communist, the government forced him into exile once again in 1937. During his three years of exile he travelled extensively through Mexico, United States and Colombia. Otero Silva also joined the International Brigades supporting the Republicans during the Spanish Civil War.

Once back in Venezuela, he co-founded the humorous weekly newspaper El Morrocoy Azul (The Blue Tortoise), along with Francisco José Delgado and Claudio Cedeño. He also founded a leftist weekly paper called, ¡Aquí Está! (Here It Is! ).

In 1943 Otero Silva's father, Henrique Otero Vizcarrondo, founded the daily newspaper El Nacional.  He appointed his son head of press, which coincided with Otero Silva's resolution to study journalism at Universidad Central de Venezuela. In 1946, he married María Teresa Castillo, a fellow journalist, graduating from university in 1949. Two years later, Otero left the Communist Party of Venezuela, claiming that he wasn't ready for political discipline. Instead, he chose to dedicate himself to his writing. He spent a year in Guárico, investigating the history of the village of Ortiz, since its initial foundation to its abandonment due to malaria breakout. The village served as inspiration for his next novel, Casas Muertas, published in 1955. The novel was awarded with the Premio Nacional de Literatura, and the Premio de Novela Arístides Rojas that same year.

His newspaper, El Nacional, was suspended twice during the military rule of Marcos Pérez Jiménez. Towards the end of the dictatorship, Otero Silva was arrested for editing and publishing the Manifiesto de los Intelectuales (Intellectuals Manifesto), a text attacking Pérez Jiménez' administration.

1958–1985
After Marcos Pérez Jiménez was overthrown in 1958, Otero was awarded with the National Prize for Journalism, and  elected to the Venezuelan Senate, representing the state of Aragua. However, no long after, El Nacional was once more criticized for espousing communist and leftist ideals, this time by the new government of Rómulo Betancourt. The Government's discontent with the newspaper caused Otero Silva to resign from active journalism.

His fictional works from the period include Oficina N° 1, in 1961, and La Muerte de Honorio in 1963, along with Las Celestiales in 1965, a book of couplets with humorous references to politics, ideologies, and religion, which he signed as "Iñaki de Errandonea", a fictional jesuit priest invented by Otero himself.

In 1967, Otero Silva was made a full member of the Academia Venezolana de la Lengua. As a senator, he promoted the creation of the Instituto Nacional de Cultura y Bellas Artes (INCIBA) in the 1970s, and participated in the founding of the Galería de Arte Nacional. In 1979, Otero was awarded with the Lenin Peace Prize.

In 1985, shortly after publishing La Piedra que era Cristo, Otero Silva died in Caracas on August 28.

Honours
 Premio Nacional de Literatura (1955, for the novel Casas Muertas)
 National Prize of Journalism
 Member of the Academia Venezolana de la Lengua (1967)
 Lenin Peace Prize (1979)

Bibliography

Novels
 Fiebre (Fever, 1939)
 Casas Muertas (Dead Houses, 1955)
 Oficina N° 1 (Office N° 1, 1961)
 La Muerte de Honorio (The Death of Honorio, 1963)
 Cuando quiero llorar no lloro (When I want to cry, I don't, 1970)
 Lope de Aguirre, Príncipe de la Libertad (Lope de Aguirre, Prince of Freedom, 1979)
 La Piedra que era Cristo (The Stone that was Christ, 1985)

Poetry
 Agua y Cauce (Water and Ditch, 1937)
 25 poemas (25 poems, 1942)
 Elegía coral a Andrés Eloy Blanco (Coral Elegy to Andrés Eloy Blanco, 1958)
 La Mar que es el Morir (1965)
 Las Celestiales (The Celestials, 1965)
 Umbral (1966)

Trivia
In the first five novels by Otero, the number of words comprising the title are the same as the number of order in which they are published. Fiebre, the first novel by Otero, has only one word; the second, Casas Muertas, has two; and so until Cuando quiero llorar, no lloro, the fifth novel with a five-word title. After this, the pattern is not followed anymore. This may seem as an intentional detail by Otero.
 In 2006 Argenis Martínez made a biographical book about the life of Miguel Otero Silva, for the Biblioteca Biográfica Venezolana, with the seal of El Nacional.

References

External links
 Biography of Miguel Otero Silva
 Casas Muertas (Dead Houses) - The complete novel in the original language, and other minor works.

1908 births
1985 deaths
People from Barcelona, Venezuela
Venezuelan people of Galician descent
Venezuelan novelists
Venezuelan male writers
Male novelists
Lenin Peace Prize recipients
Central University of Venezuela alumni
Members of the Senate of Venezuela
Members of the Venezuelan Academy of Language
20th-century novelists
International Brigades personnel
Generation of 1928